Harvey D. Parker (1805–1884), also known as H.D. Parker, was an hotelier in Boston, Massachusetts. He built the Parker House, the first hotel in the United States "on the European Plan".

Biography
Parker was born in Temple, Maine, and spent much of his youth in Paris, Maine. In 1825, at age 20, he moved to Boston. He began working at Hunt's restaurant, Court Square, in 1832. A few months later he bought out the owner, and in 1833 opened Parker's Restaurant in the basement of 4 Court Square. He married in 1839. With John F. Mills he established the firm of Parker & Mills in 1845. The partnership lasted until Mills' death in 1876.

Parker House
In 1854, he built the Parker House hotel and restaurant, "an immense establishment of marble", designed by architect William Washburn. Located on School Street in Boston, it occupied the former site of the Boston Latin School, and later the house of Jacob Wendell, great-grandfather of Oliver Wendell Holmes, Sr. The hotel opened in 1855 and expanded in 1858.

Around 1880, with Joseph H. Beckman and Edward O. Punchard, Parker established the firm Harvey D. Parker & Co.  His partners took over the business after Parker's death in 1884. On November 16, 1882, a large public dinner was held in honor of Parker's 50 years in business. He was also a member of the Boston Club.

Death and legacy
Parker died in 1884 at age 80. A funeral was held at the Arlington Street Church; the facade of the Parker House was "heavily draped" in mourning. He was buried at Mount Auburn Cemetery. He left $100,000 to the Museum of Fine Arts, Boston, providing funds for objects in the museum's Harvey D. Parker Collection.

References

Further reading

"Clever blackmailing; A Shrewd and Daring Attempt to Extort Money. Harvey D. Parker the Victim of the Infamous Scheme. The Failure of the Well-Laid Plans of "Scott Munroe." Cramped and Evidently Disguised Closely Followed by the Officers. Begged Mr. Parker to Leave Town." Boston Daily Globe, March 10, 1882. p. 2.
"Harvey D. Parker. His Life of Energy and Charity Brought to a Close. A Man Wrought Deserved Success by ... of Patient, Honest Effort. Strict Attention of Business the Secret of His Prosperity. A Momentous Affair. Kind and Affectionate." Boston Daily Globe, May 31, 1884. p. 1.
"Worth over a million; Inventory of Harvey D. Parker's Estate in the Suffolk Prebate Court." Boston Daily Globe, January 27, 1885. p. 6.
"Our business pioneers; men, who built up manufacturing New England; Harvey D. Parker, who made a Boston hotel famous; Born at Temple, Me. May 10, 1805." Boston Daily Globe, January 25, 1916. p. 11.

American hoteliers
People from Paris, Maine
Businesspeople from Boston
1805 births
1884 deaths
19th century in Boston
Financial District, Boston
Economic history of Boston
American Unitarians
Burials at Mount Auburn Cemetery
People from Temple, Maine
19th-century American businesspeople